László Tancsics (born 19 May 1978) is a Hungarian weightlifter. He competed in the men's bantamweight event at the 2004 Summer Olympics.

References

External links
 

1978 births
Living people
Hungarian male weightlifters
Olympic weightlifters of Hungary
Weightlifters at the 2004 Summer Olympics
People from Zalaegerszeg
Sportspeople from Zala County